KGRB (94.3 FM, "Radio Lazer 94.3") is an American radio station broadcasting a Regional Mexican music format. It is licensed to Jackson, California, United States, and serves the Sacramento, California, area.  The station used to be owned by Adelante Media Group, LLC. On October 21, 2014, Adelante announced that it was selling KGRB, its sister stations and its LPTV outlet in Sacramento to Lazer Broadcasting, pending FCC approval. The transaction was consummated effective December 31, 2014, at a price of $2.9 million.

History
The station used to be called "Magia 94.3". The call letters KLMG have been moved to 97.9 FM Esparto, California.

Previous owners include Salem Communications and Univision Communications. Salem sold the station to Bustos Media in 2006, who conveyed it to Adelante Media Group in 2010.

References

External links

GRB
Regional Mexican radio stations in the United States
Radio stations established in 1973
GRB
1973 establishments in California